Norma Monserrat Bustamante Laferte (born 2 May 1983) is a Chilean musician, singer, composer and painter with Mexican citizenship. She is known for her musical versatility, having composed songs in a wide variety of genres such as pop, rock, bolero, cumbia and salsa. In the 2010s she gained acclaim for her melodramatics and "captivating stage persona".

By 2019, she was the Chilean artist with the most listeners on Spotify worldwide, as well as being the Chilean artist with the most nominations in a single edition of the Latin Grammy Awards (5 in 2017).

To date she has sold over 1,5 million digital records in Latin America between albums and singles, making her the best-selling Chilean artist in the digital era. Some of her successes include "Tormento", "Amor completo", "Si tú me quisieras", "Tu falta de querer", "Amárrame", and "Mi buen amor". She received a Latin Grammy in 2017 for Best Alternative Song for "Amárrame".

Early life and education 
Mon Laferte was born Norma Monserrat Bustamante Laferte in Viña del Mar, Chile. She cites her grandmother who sang boleros as one of her first influences, and also recalls following her at young age to tango clubs in Valparaíso. She started her career at the age of 9, after winning a guitar in a singing contest. She received a scholarship to attend a musical conservatory in Viña del Mar at the age of 13, and soon after began playing in bars in Valparaíso and Santiago.

In October 2013, Laferte became a vegetarian for ethical reasons. As of 2017, she is a vegan.

On 30 November 2022, Laferte became a naturalized Mexican citizen.

Career 
In 2003, Laferte, then known as Monserrat Bustamante, entered in the Chilean reality competition series Rojo. The same year she released her first studio album, La Chica de Rojo. The album had great success in Chile, receiving Gold and Platinum certifications. She became part of the Clan Rojo and was on the television series for four seasons.

In 2007, Laferte decided to start a new chapter in her musical career by moving from Chile to Mexico City, where she began singing in nightclubs and recording cover songs. In 2009, she released a single titled "Lo mismo que yo", which was to be the lead single from an upcoming album. The same year, Laferte was diagnosed with thyroid cancer, effectively putting a halt to her album.

Around the time of her battle with cancer, she abandoned her original stage name and introduced the world to Mon Laferte, expressing that the name represented a new beginning for her:"Mi cambio de nombre no es por querer ser otra persona, es que las circunstancias de la vida me han llevado a cambiar mucho y sentí que tenía que empezar de cero."Laferte decided to scrap the album she was recording in 2009, and returned two years later with her second studio album, titled Desechable. The next year, in 2012, she was invited to judge the second season of the Chilean version of The X Factor, called Factor X, along with Karen Doggenweiler, Tito Beltrán and José Luis Rodríguez.

It is also at this time her presentation at the beginning of 2012 as a vocalist of the Mexican heavy metal female band Mystica Girls, with whom in February 2014 she recorded the album titled Gates of Hell.

In 2013, she released her third album, Tornasol. She received media attention in 2015 with her single "Tu falta de querer" from the album Mon Laferte, Vol.1. In 2016, she won a MTV Millennial Award for the "Latin Video of the Year" and receiving two nominations on the Latin Grammy Awards of 2016 for Best New Artist and Best Alternative Music Album.

Laferte released her fifth album La Trenza, her most acclaimed album to date, in 2017. Her single with Colombian rock star Juanes, "Amárrame", won the Best Alternative Song award at the 18th Latin GRAMMYs, in which she was also nominated for Best Alternative Music Album, Song of the Year, Album of the Year, and Record of the Year. She also wins the category "Best North Latin Artist" in the 2017 MTV Europe Music Awards.

In February 2018 she released the single "Antes de Ti" that was nominated to the 19th Annual Latin Grammy Awards as "Song of the Year". The video for the single was also Mon Laferte's directorial debut. In June 2018, she co-hosted the 2018 MTV Millennial Awards in Mexico City at the Mexico City Arena along with the Venezuelan YouTube personality La Divaza.

During the year 2018, Mon worked on her sixth studio album, Norma , which was recorded in a single session in studio A of Capitol Studios of Los Angeles, the recording was made in one shot, without using the overdubbing technique of audio layers, but all the instruments playing simultaneously to give the material the feeling of live recording. In this recording 13 musicians participated. The production of this album was in charge of Omar Rodríguez-López, the recording engineer was Bruce Botnick. The album was released on 9 November 2018.

On 26 October, a collaboration was published for the new Christmas album of the American singer Gwen Stefani, in a version of the song "Feliz Navidad" by the Puerto Rican singer-songwriter José Feliciano. At the end of 2018, the international television network HTV nominated Mon Laferte in the "Best Southern Artist" category of the Heat Latin Music Awards 2019.

In January 2019, she was announced to participate in the American Music Festival Coachella. In February 2019, Mon Laferte received her first nomination at the Billboard Latin Music Awards in the Top Latin Albums Artist of the Year category, Female. Also the Album Norma received a Gold record in Mexico for 30,000 copies sold.

In May 2019, the singer announced her U.S. tour, under the headline "La Gira de Norma". The first tour date is set for 10 August 2019, in Seattle's Neptune Theatre, following a European tour that same Summer. On 14 November 2019, Mon Laferte made headlines with her act of political protest, exposing her breasts at the Latin Grammys to display the message "En Chile Torturan Violan y Matan" (English translation: In Chile they torture, rape and kill) on her bare chest.

On 19 November 2019, Laferte was interviewed by Patricia Janiot from Univision. In that interview, Mon Laferte justified the looting and burning of numerous supermarkets and other buildings by saying that "they were only material goods". When asked if she condemned violence, she said, "I do not approve of any kind of violence. Now, if you ask me personally, if I have to go burn down a supermarket that has robbed from me my entire life to demand the basic rights I feel I deserve, I will do it!" She accused the police and armed forces of burning the dozens of subway stations that were burnt by rioters on 18 October 2019.

On 30 November 2019, Laferte was subpoenaed by Chilean prosecutors to give a statement regarding the evidence she may or may not have to support her accusation that Chilean police and armed forces actively participated in the burning of subway stations. Chilean police announced that, depending upon her statement, they might press criminal charges against her. The charges were later dropped.

In 2021, Laferte contributed a cover of the Metallica song "Nothing Else Matters" to the charity tribute album The Metallica Blacklist.

In June 2022, she announced her Mexican citizenship during a press conference stating “Llevo 15 años en México, tengo un hijo mexicano, mi pareja es mexicana. Pero esto es hermoso, es la cereza del pastel!” The now Chilean Mexican singer stated that she was happy to have her new nationality since she has called Mexico her home for the past 15 years. During which time she built up and created her career as the persona we now know as Mon Laferte.

Visual arts 

On 11 March 2020, she debuted as a visual artist in the solo exhibit entitled Gestures at the Museum of the City of Mexico, containing 76 art pieces. Laferte commented she has painted for ten years as a self-taught artist with some lessons from her father, a painter himself.

Discography 

Studio albums
 La Chica de Rojo (2003)
 Desechable (2011)
 Tornasol (2013)
 Mon Laferte Vol.1 (2015)
 La Trenza (2017)
 Norma (2018)
 Seis (2021)
 1940 Carmen (2021)

Awards and nominations
Grammy Awards
The Grammy Awards are presented annually by The Recording Academy to recognize achievements in the music industry.

Latin Grammy Awards
A Latin Grammy Award is an accolade by the Latin Academy of Recording Arts & Sciences to recognize outstanding achievement in the music industry.

|-
| style="text-align:center;" rowspan="2"|2016 || Mon Laferte || Best New Artist || 
|-
|Mon Laferte Vol.1 || Best Alternative Music Album || 
|-
| style="text-align:center;" rowspan="5"| 2017 ||rowspan="2"|La Trenza || Album of the Year || 
|-
| Best Alternative Music Album || 
|-
| rowspan="3"|"Amárrame" || Record of the Year || 
|-
| Song of the Year || 
|-
| Best Alternative Song || 
|-
| 2018 ||"Antes de Ti" ||  Song of the Year || 
|-
| style="text-align:center;" |2019 || Norma || Best Alternative Music Album || 
|-
| style="text-align:center;" rowspan="2"|2020 || "Chilango Blues" || Best Alternative Song || 
|-
| "Biutiful" || Best Rock Song || 
|-
| style="text-align:center;" rowspan="4"| 2021 
|"Que Se Sepa Nuestro Amor" || Song of the Year || 
|-
| "La Mujer" || Best Pop Song || 
|-
| Seis || Best Singer-Songwriter Album || 
|-
| "Que Se Sepa Nuestro Amor" || Best Regional Song || 
|-
| 2022 || "Algo es Mejor" || Song of the Year || 
|-
|}

Billboard Latin Music Awards
The Billboard Latin Music Awards are presented annually by Billboard magazine and recognize outstanding chart performances.

MTV Europe Music Awards
The MTV Europe Music Awards was established in 1994 by MTV Europe to award the music videos from European and international artists.

|-
| style="text-align:center;" rowspan="1"| 2016 || rowspan="4"| Mon Laferte || Best Latin America North Act || 

|-
| style="text-align:center;" rowspan="1"| 2017 || Best Latin America North Act || 

|-
| style="text-align:center;" rowspan="1"| 2018 || Best Latin America North Act || 
|-
| style="text-align:center;" rowspan="1"| 2019 || Best Latin America North Act || 
|}

MTV Millennial Awards
The MTV Millennial Awards, held annually in Mexico, were established in 2013 by MTV Latin America to award music artists.

|-
| style="text-align:center;" rowspan="3"|2016 || Mon Laferte || Buzz Artist || 
|-
|| "Tu falta de querer" || Video of the Year || 
|-
|| "Palmar" (with Caloncho) || Collaboration of the Year || 
|-
| style="text-align:center;" rowspan="4"| 2017 || rowspan="2"| "Amárrame" (with Juanes) || Collaboration of the Year || 
|-
|| Video of the Year || 
|-
|| Mon Laferte || #InstaCrush || 
|-
|| Mon Laferte || Mexican Artist of the Year || 
|-
| style="text-align:center;" rowspan="2"| 2018 || Mon Laferte || Mexican Artist of the Year || 
|-
|| "Antes de Ti" || Video of the Year || 
|-
| style="text-align:center;" rowspan="4"| 2019 || rowspan="1"| "El Beso" || Video of the Year || 
|-
|| Mon Laferte || Arriba Mujeres || 
|-
|| Mon Laferte || Mexican Artist of the Year || 
|-
|| "Amor" (with Los Auténticos Decadentes)  || Ship Musical || 
|-
| style="text-align:center;" rowspan="1"| 2021 || Mon Laferte || Mexican Artist of the Year || 
|-
|}

Premios Juventud
The Premios Juventud are awarded annually by Univision to honor pop culture of young Hispanic and Latino Americans. 

Premios Lo Nuestro 
The Lo Nuestro Awards are awarded annually by Univision recognize the most popular Spanish-language music.

Shock Awards
The SHOCK awards held annually in Colombia. They recognize artistic and technical excellence in the arts and sciences of recorded music, through public voting. It has become a prestigious award in national and international music.

|-
| style="text-align:center;" rowspan="1"| 2016 
|| Mon Laferte || Best Artist or Group "New Latin American Wave" || 
|}

Heat Latin Music Awards
The Heat Latin Music Awards are presented annually by HTV to reward the best of Latin music.

Spotify Awards
The Spotify Awards founded in 2020 is the first-ever award ceremony 100% based on user-generated data from Mexico and Latin America.

Telehit Awards
This is an annual award show run by the Mexican music channel Telehit.

|-
| style="text-align:center;" rowspan="1"|2016 || rowspan="4" | Mon Laferte || Best Artist or Rock Band || 
|-
| style="text-align:center;" rowspan="3"|2017 || Best Pop / Rock Artist || 
|-
||Best Act of the Night || 
|-
||You saw my joke || 
|}

Viña del Mar International Song Festival
The Viña del Mar International Song Festival is a music festival that has been held annually during the third week of February in Viña del Mar, Chile. Started in 1960, it is the oldest and largest music festival in Latin America.

|-
| style="text-align:center;" rowspan="3"|2017 || rowspan="5" | Mon Laferte|| "Gaviota de Oro" || 
|-
||"Gaviota de Plata" || 
|-
||"Reina del Monstruo"|| 
|-
|style="text-align:center;" rowspan="2"|2020|| "Gaviota de Oro" || 
|-
||"Gaviota de Plata" || 
|- 
|}

Copihue de Oro
The Copihue de Oro is an award created by the Chilean newspaper La Cuarta to recognize the figures of the world of entertainment and entertainment in the country.

|-
| style="text-align:center;" rowspan="1"| 2007 || rowspan="3" | Mon Laferte || Female Artist || 
|-
| style="text-align:center;" rowspan="2"| 2017 || Best Group or Popular/Tropical Singer || 
|-
||Revelation || 
|-
| style="text-align:center;" rowspan="1"| 2021 || rowspan="3" | Mon Laferte || Artist of the Decade || 
|-
|}

Pulsar Awards
The Pulsar Awards were created in 2015 by the Chilean Copyright Society (SCD) of Chile to recognize the best of the musical creation of that country in the period of one year.

|-
| style="text-align:center;" rowspan="5"| 2018 || rowspan="2" | Mon Laferte || Artist of the Year || 
|-
|| Best Pop Artist || 
|-
|| La Trenza || Album of the year || 
|-
|| "Amárrame" || Song of the Year|| 
|-
|| "Amárrame" || Song most listened to on Chilean radiosSong of the Year|| 
|-
| style="text-align:center;" rowspan="6"| 2019 || rowspan="2" | Mon Laferte || Artist of the Year || 
|-
|| Best Pop Artist || 
|-
|| Norma || Album of the year || 
|-
|| "El Beso" || Song of the Year|| 
|-
|| "El Beso" || Video of the Year|| 
|-
|| "Amárrame" || Song most listened to on Chilean radiosSong of the Year|| 
|-
| style="text-align:center;" rowspan="1"| 2020 || rowspan="1" | "El Beso" || Song most listened to on Chilean radiosSong of the Year || 
|-
|}

Gardel Awards

|-
| style="text-align:center;" rowspan="1"| 2019 || "Amor" feat. Los Auténticos Decadentes ||rowspan="1"|"Collaboration of the Year" || 
|-
|}

Lunas del Auditorio
"Lunas del Auditorio" is a recognition granted by the National Auditorium to the best live shows in Mexico.

|-
| style="text-align:center;" rowspan="1"| 2018 || rowspan="1" | Mon Laferte || Pop in Spanish || 
|}

Eliot Awards

"Eliot Awards" is a recognition in México to Spanish-speaking digital leaders who through their talent, effort, originality and impact are generating highly relevant content on social networks.

|-
| style="text-align:center;" rowspan="1"| 2019 || rowspan="1" | Mon Laferte || Social Sound || 
|}

Fans Choice Awards
"Fans Choice Awards" is an Award for the Best Signature of Autographs and / or Showcase of the Year in Mexico, organized by Showcase Entertainment S.A.

|-
| style="text-align:center;" rowspan="1"| 2017 || rowspan="10" | Mon Laferte || Rock || 
|-
| style="text-align:center;" rowspan="1"| 2018 || Rock || 
|-
| style="text-align:center;" rowspan="3"| 2019 || Rock/Indie || 
|-
||Salsa/Cumbia/Tropical || 
|-
||Latin Pop || 
|-
| style="text-align:center;" rowspan="1"| 2020 || Rock || 
|-
| style="text-align:center;" rowspan="3"| 2021 || Female Pop Artist || 
|-
||Mariachi / Music Ranchera Female Soloist || 
|-
||Best Female Video (Feat.) || 
|-
| style="text-align:center;" rowspan="1"| 2022 ||Mariachi / Music Ranchera || 
|-

Musa Awards
Musa Awards was created to distinguish the best of music in Chile.

|-
| style="text-align:center;" rowspan="4"| 2020 || Que Se Sepa Nuestro Amor ||rowspan="2"|"National Collaboration of the Year" || 
|-
|| "La Danza de Las Libélulas"|| 
|-
|| "Plata Ta Tá" ||rowspan="1"|"Song of the Year" || 
|-
 || Mon Laferte ||rowspan="1"|"Muse Artist of the Year" || 
|-
|}

Society of Authors and Composers of Mexico (SACM)

|-
| style="text-align:center;" rowspan="2"| 2018 || "Tu falta de querer" ||rowspan="2"|"Presea Exito SACM" || 
|-
|| "Amárrame" || 
|-
| style="text-align:center;" rowspan="1"| 2019 || "Mi Buen Amor" ||rowspan="1"|"Presea Exito SACM" || 
|-
|}

Natida Awards
Natida, Chilean of the Year Awards are a set of recognition awards given to individuals based on contributions of excellence, exceptional achievements and / or outstanding behavior.

Luces Awards
The Luces Awards are a recognition of the best of Peruvian art, cinema, literature and other cultural expressions by the newspaper "El Comercio".

Filmography

See also 
 Canción sin miedo

References

External links
 Official website
 Mystica Girls' official website
 Mon Laferte on Facebook

1983 births
Living people
Chilean emigrants to Mexico
Chilean film actresses
Chilean guitarists
Chilean people of French descent
Chilean pop singers
Chilean rock singers
Chilean singer-songwriters
Electronica musicians
Latin Grammy Award winners
Latin music songwriters
MTV Europe Music Award winners
Musicians from Viña del Mar
People from Viña del Mar
Rock en Español musicians
Women in Latin music
21st-century Chilean women singers